The 2010–11 season of the Bayernliga, the highest association football league in Bavaria, was the third season of the league at tier five (V) of the German football league system and the 66th season overall since establishment of the league in 1945. The season started on 25 July 2010 and finished after 34 rounds on 28 May 2011, followed by three more relegation play-off games in early June.

Overview
As the league champions, FC Ismaning, declined promotion for financial reasons, the runners-up FC Ingolstadt 04 II were directly promoted to the 2011–12 Regionalliga Süd. As Ismaning already announced during the winter break that it intended not apply for a Regionalliga licence, fears were voiced the competition could be affected negatively by this but the team continued its good form and took out the championship regardless. The three worst placed teams, SpVgg Bayreuth, SV Schalding-Heining and Freier TuS Regensburg were relegated to their respective Landesligas. The 15th placed team, SpVgg Bayern Hof, won its relegation match and was able to secure its league spot for another season. Bayern Hof, who was already relegated was able to overturn a 2-point deduction and consequently finished on equal points with SpVgg Bayreuth on place 15 and 16. In the necessary decider, Hof overcame Bayreuth 2–1 in extra time and earned the right to enter the relegation play-off while Bayreuth was directly relegated.

While no team was relegated to the league for the 2011–12 season, three teams were directly promoted to the league, SB/DJK Rosenheim, SC Eltersdorf and VfL Frohnlach. Additionally, the TSV Gersthofen was promoted through the play-off round. While Rosenheim makes its first return to the league since 1979, Frohnlach won immediate promotion back to the league after suffering relegation in 2010. Eltersdorf will play in the Bayernliga for the first time in the club's history while Gersthofen has not played in the league since the 1960s.

The best supported team during the season was the 1. FC Schweinfurt 05 with 913 spectators per match while the SpVgg Unterhaching II had the worst support with an average of 188. Schweinfurt also set the attendance record for the season, drawing 3,078 spectators in the club's home game against Würzburger FV. TSV 1860 Rosenheim set both the record for the biggest away- and home win, set on consecutive weekends. On 14 May, the club defeated FSV Erlangen-Bruck 7–0 in Rosenheim, followed by a 6–0 win at FC Eintracht Bamberg on 21 May, with Rosenheim winning all of its last eight games of the season.

Benjamin Neunteufel of relegated side SV Schalding-Heining took out the top-scorer honors, scoring 25 goals, four more than runners-up Peter Heyer. Heyer, who had been the league's top scorer in 2006–07 and 2007–08, then with FC Eintracht Bamberg. He initially played for FSV Erlangen-Bruck (16 goals) before making a return to Bamberg (5 goals) during the winter break. After the relegation of Schalding-Heining, Neunteufel opted to join Austrian Regionalliga club FC Wels instead of another Bayernliga club, not wanting to move away from Passau.

During the season, it was decided that the 2011–12 season would be the last for the league in its current format. From 2012, the league will be played in two regional divisions, north and south.

The league featured five new clubs for the 2010–11 season:
 FC Eintracht Bamberg, relegated from the Regionalliga Süd
 SV Heimstetten, promoted from the Landesliga Süd
 1. FC Schweinfurt 05 and Würzburger FV, promoted from the Landesliga Nord
 Freier TuS Regensburg, promoted from the Landesliga Mitte

League table

Top goalscorers

The top goal scorers for the season:

25 goals
  Benjamin Neunteufel (SV Schalding-Heining)

21 goals
  Peter Heyer (FSV Erlangen-Bruck/FC Eintracht Bamberg)

19 goals
  Florian Niederlechner (FC Ismaning)

17 goals
  Nicolas Görtler (FC Eintracht Bamberg)

16 goals
  Ralf Klingmann (TSV Buchbach)
  Tobias Riedner (Würzburger FV)

Play-offs

Decider for 15th place
A decider was necessary to determine the 15th and 16th place as the BFV does not recognise the goal difference as a means to determine relegation and promotion spots when two or more clubs are on equal points but instead requires a decider to be played:

Promotion round

The 2011 promotion round to the Bayernliga:

Key
 (B) denotes Bayernliga club
 (S) denotes Landesliga Süd club
 (M) denotes Landesliga Mitte club
 (N) denotes Landesliga Nord club

References

External links 
  of the Bavarian Football Association 
 Bayernliga 2010–11 on Fupa.net 
 Bayernliga 2010–11 on Weltfussball.de 

2010-11
2010–11 Oberliga